Terrence "Terry" E. Holt M.D. (sometimes credited as "T.E. Holt") is an American Geriatric Internal doctor, and writer as well as a former professor of literature at Rutgers University and Swarthmore College.

Biography
He graduated from Cornell University, and from University of North Carolina, Chapel Hill.

His single debut book, a collection of short stories entitled In the Valley of the Kings, which was praised by Pulitzer Prize winner Junot Diaz, National Book Award winner Gerald Stern, National Book Award finalist Aleksandar Hemon.

Works
; W.W. Norton. .
Internal Medicine: A Doctor's Stories, Liveright Publishing Corporation, 2015,

References

External links
 
 Mundow, Anna. "New Marriage of Science and Fiction." Interview.  The Boston Globe, November 15, 2009 .
 Neary, Lynn.  "Story Specialists: Doctors who Write."  "All Things Considered," National Public Radio, Nov 17, 2009 .
 Nimocks, Amber, and Frank Stasio.  "In the Valley of the Kings."  Radio Interview, "The State of Things," WUNC-FM, Chapel Hill, NC Sep 15, 2009 .

American horror writers
American science fiction writers
American short story writers
Rutgers University faculty
Swarthmore College faculty
Living people
American male short story writers
American male novelists
Novelists from Pennsylvania
Novelists from New Jersey
Year of birth missing (living people)